President for life is a title assumed by or granted to some presidents to extend their tenure up until their death. The title sometimes confers on the holder the right to nominate or appoint a successor. The usage of the title of "president for life" rather than a traditionally autocratic title, such as that of a monarch, implies the subversion of liberal democracy by the titleholder (although republics need not be democratic per se). Indeed, sometimes a president for life can proceed to establish a self-proclaimed monarchy, such as Jean-Jacques Dessalines and Henry Christophe in Haiti.

Similarity to a monarch
A president for life may be regarded as a de facto monarch. In fact, other than the title, political scientists often face difficulties in differentiating a state ruled by a president for life (especially one who inherits the job from a family dictatorship) and a monarchy – indeed, Samoa's long-serving President for life, Malietoa Tanumafili II, was frequently and mistakenly referred to as King. In his proposed plan for government at the United States Constitutional Convention Alexander Hamilton proposed that the chief executive be a governor elected to serve for good behavior, acknowledging that such an arrangement might be seen as an elective monarchy.  It was for that very reason that the proposal was rejected. A notable difference between a monarch and a president-for-life is that the successor of the president does not necessarily possess a life-long term, like in Turkmenistan and Samoa.

Most leaders who have proclaimed themselves president for life have not in fact successfully gone on to serve a life term. Most have been deposed long before their death while others achieve a lifetime presidency by being assassinated while in office. However, some have managed to rule until their (natural) deaths, including José Gaspar Rodríguez de Francia of Paraguay, Alexandre Pétion of Haiti, Rafael Carrera of Guatemala, François Duvalier of Haiti, Josip Broz Tito of Yugoslavia, and Saparmurat Niyazov of Turkmenistan. Others made unsuccessful attempts to have themselves named president for life, such as Mobutu Sese Seko of Zaire in 1972.

People frequently cited as being examples of Presidents for Life include very long-serving authoritarian or totalitarian presidents such as Zaire's Mobutu, North Korea's Kim Il-sung, Bulgaria's Todor Zhivkov, Romania's Nicolae Ceaușescu, Syria's Hafez al-Assad, Indonesia's Suharto, Nationalist China's Chiang Kai-shek, Communist China's Mao Zedong, Iraq's Saddam Hussein, Russia's Vladimir Putin, Belarus's Alexander Lukashenko and Vietnam's Hồ Chí Minh. They were never officially granted life terms and, in fact, underwent periodic renewals of mandate that were in some cases sham elections. Following the abolition of term limits for the President of the People's Republic of China, the current President Xi Jinping has been identified by some observers as a potential or aspiring President for life, who is also the General Secretary of the Chinese Communist Party, the de facto highest position in China and already without term limit. According to reports from US-funded Freedom House, official election results in Belarus and Russia show implausibly high levels of support (in some cases, unanimous support).

In popular culture
In the film Escape from L.A., the President played by Cliff Robertson is given a life term by a constitutional amendment after an earthquake ravages Los Angeles and leads to the President's shocking electoral victory. At the end of the film, Snake played by Kurt Russell puts an end to his regime when he uses an EMP aiming device remote ending all governments including that of his dictatorship.

Most notable

Julius Caesar
One of the most well-known incidents of a republican leader extending his term indefinitely was Roman dictator Julius Caesar, who made himself "Perpetual Dictator" in 45 BC. Traditionally, the office of dictator could only be held for six months, and although he was not the first Roman dictator to be given the office with no term limit, it was Caesar's dictatorship that inspired the string of Roman emperors who ruled after his assassination.

Napoleon Bonaparte
Caesar's actions would later be copied by the French Consul Napoleon Bonaparte, who was appointed "First Consul for life" in 1802 before elevating himself to the rank of Emperor two years later. Since then, many dictators have adopted similar titles, either on their own authority or having it granted to them by rubber stamp legislatures.

Adolf Hitler
Adolf Hitler was appointed Chancellor of Germany by President Paul von Hindenburg in January 1933. On Hindenburg's death in August 1934, the German Reichstag voted to (unconstitutionally) merge the offices of President and Chancellor, giving Hitler the title of Führer. Later the Reichstag voted to allow Hitler to hold the positions of Chancellor and Führer for life.

North Korea

After Kim Il-sung's death in 1994, the North Korean government wrote the presidential office out of the constitution, declaring him "Eternal President" in 1998. Since there can be no succession when the President maintains control through death, the powers of the office were nominally split between the Chairman of the Supreme People's Assembly, the premier, and the chairman of the National Defence Commission. Even though it was not stated by the amended constitution, the Chairman of the National Defense Commission became the de facto highest leadership position and the highest office in the state. In 2009, these powers of the Chairman of the National Defense Commission were realised and the position was designated as the supreme leader of the country.

After Kim Jong-il's death in 2011, he received a similar treatment to his father Kim Il-sung, being declared "Eternal General Secretary of the Workers' Party of Korea" and "Eternal Chairman of the National Defense Commission". These two positions were abolished and replaced with the First Secretary of the Workers' Party of Korea and the First Chairman of the National Defence Commission respectively, with First Chairman being declared as the supreme leader. Both these positions were filled by Kim Jong-un in 2012. Since 2016, the National Defence Commission was abolished with the State Affairs Commission established in its place. The President of the State Affairs (commission chairman) was placed as the head of state and supreme leader.

The validity and nature of these titles have been raised into question, as Kim Jong-un was elected General Secretary of the Workers' Party of Korea in January 2021, taking his father's eternal position.

List of leaders who became president for life
Note: The first date listed in each entry is the date of proclamation of the status as President for Life.

Notes

References

Further reading

External links
 The List: Presidents for Life // Foreign Policy, November 5, 2007
Heads of state
 
Titles of national or ethnic leadership
Term limits